Juhan Must (1862 Sangaste Parish (now Otepää Parish), Kreis Dorpat – ?) was an Estonian politician. He was a member of II Riigikogu. He was a member of the Riigikogu since 12 April 1924. He replaced Peeter Palovere. On 25 April 1924, he resigned his position and he was replaced by Eduard Peterson.

References

1862 births
Year of death missing
People from Otepää Parish
People from Kreis Dorpat
Workers' United Front politicians
Members of the Riigikogu, 1923–1926